John Orr was a 20th-century Anglican Bishop. 

Born in 1874 and educated at Trinity College, Dublin, Orr was ordained in 1900. He began his ministry with curacies at St John's, Dublin and All Saints, Aghade, and St Nicholas, Dundalk and Kilmore Cathedral. In 1912 he became rector of Sligo and in 1917 appointed Dean of Tuam. In 1923 he became Bishop of Tuam and in 1927 was translated to Meath. He died in post on 21 July 1938.

Notes

External links
 

1874 births
1938 deaths
Alumni of Trinity College Dublin
Deans of Tuam
Bishops of Tuam, Killala, and Achonry
Anglican bishops of Meath
20th-century Anglican bishops in Ireland